Holy Trinity monastery is the title of several Christian monasteries, including 
(sorted by the country):

 Holy Trinity Monastery Church, Pepel, Albania
 Etropole Monastery of the Holy Trinity (AKA Varovitets), near Etropole, Bulgaria
 Patriarchal Monastery of the Holy Trinity, a monastery near Veliko Tarnovo, Bulgaria
 Lintula Holy Trinity Convent, Finland
 Monastery of the Holy Trinity, Meteora, Greece
 Holy Trinity Abbey, Lough Key, Ireland
 Church and monastery of the Holy Trinity, Vilnius, Lithuania
 Monastery of the Holy Trinity of Pljevlja, Montenegro
 Holy Trinity Monastery (Strâmba), Romania
 Saharna Monastery of the Holy Trinity, Romania
 Trinity-St. Sergius Lavra, about 90 km north-east of Moscow, Russia
 Monastery of the Holy Trinity, Kikinda, Serbia
 Holy Trinity Monastery (Jordanville, New York), United States
 Holy Trinity Monastery, East Hendred, a monastery of nuns in Oxfordshire, United Kingdom
 Abraham's Oak Holy Trinity Monastery, West Bank

See also 
 Trinity Monastery (disambiguation)
 Holy Trinity Church (disambiguation)

Christian monasteries